This is the List of municipalities in Edirne Province, Turkey .

References 

Geography of Edirne Province
Edirne